Petra Means Rock is Petra's first compilation album. It was released by StarSong in 1989.

Track listing

Personnel

Petra
 Bob Hartman - Lead Guitar, acoustic guitar, vocals (All tracks)
 Greg X. Volz - Lead Vocals, rhythm guitar, percussion (Tracks 1, 4, 6-8, 10, 12-15, 17)
 John Slick - Keyboards, vocals (Tracks 1, 4, 6, 8, 10, 12-15)
 Mark Kelly - Bass, vocals (Tracks 1-2, 4-8, 10-15, 17)
 Louie Weaver - Drums, vocals (Tracks 1-3, 5-9, 11, 14-17)
 John Schlitt - Lead Vocals (Tracks 2-3, 5, 9, 11, 16)
 John Lawry - Keyboards, vocals (Tracks 2-3, 5, 7, 9, 11, 16-17)
 Ronny Cates - Bass Guitar (Tracks 3, 9, 16)

Additional musicians
 John Elefante - Additional keyboards, vocals
 Keith Edwards - Drums (Tracks 4, 10, 12-13)
 Alex MacDougall - Percussion
 Joe Miller - Trombone
 Bob Welborn - Trumpet

References

External links
VH1 Petra Means Rock

1989 compilation albums
Petra (band) albums